Dr. Shubhendu Chatterjee (29 November 1936 – 5 July 2007) was an Indian physician and actor, who is known for acting in Bengali television and films. A contemporary of actors Uttam Kumar and Soumitra Chatterjee, with whom he played second hero in many films, Chatterjee with age had graduated into character roles.

Personal life 
His father was Shailendra Chattopadhay and mother was Manimala Devi. In 1953, he was admitted into Calcutta Medical College. In 1960, he completed his M.B.B.S. and became a physician. He worked in Civil Defence and later joined Kolkata Municipal Corporation.

He was involved with amateur theatre under the tutelage of Jnanesh Mukherjee, a stalwart of Bengali theatre and films, and started trying his luck on the silver screen. He was involved with the IPTA. Dr. Chatterjee had two sons; Saswata Chatterjee, the eldest son, is a renowned Bengali actor, while the other son is settled in the US.

Career
He started his film career with Mrinal Sen's Akash Kusum in 1965. He was appreciated for his restrained portrayal of the honest friend who would fail to prevent his go-getting friend (played by Soumitra Chatterjee) from the path of falsehood which would lead to utter humiliation. He worked with Satyajit Ray in Chiriyakhana (1967) where he first shared the screen with Uttam Kumar; he then worked with the versatile Soumitra in Aranyer Din Ratri (1969) that brought national and international fame. He is mostly remembered for his portrayal of Sankar in Chowringhee in 1968 where alongside the matinee idol Uttam Kumar, he carved his niche as the straight and compassionate apprentice (the author's character) of a five-star hotel on the brink of changing ownership. He then starred as the leading actor in Hansa Mithun (1968), Panchasar (1968), Arogya Niketon (1969), Nayikar Bhumikay, Anindita, along with playing second lead in Chaddabeshi (1972), and Ekhoni. He also played the protagonist in Bhanu Goenda Jahar Assistant. Some of his other noteworthy movies include Pratham Kadam Phool, Kuheli, Kaach Kata Hire, Aandhar Periye, Bigolito Karuna Jahnabi Yamuna, Jibon Rahasya, Bahurupi, Amrito Kumbher Sandhane, Ganasatru, Lal Darwajaa.

By the time he acted with the legendary Uttam Kumar in Chowringhee and Chaddabeshi, he was already a heartthrob with his tall, dark, handsome, and intelligent looks. He acted in the sequel of Aranyer Din Ratri, directed by Gautam Ghose, Abar Aranye, in 2003.

Recipient of many awards, Chatterjee also was a successful stage actor and the play "Bilkish Begum" staged during the 1980s was a super hit. He also played a very prominent role in the play " Amar Kantak" which also ran many nights. He acted in a number of tele-films as well; one in which he excelled was as Dr. Munshi in "Dr. Munshi's diary" based on a short story by Satyajit Ray. He was a very good singer as well and cut a disc on composition of Hemanta Mukhopadhyay.

Death 
He died from respiratory tract complications. The Bengali film industry went into a state of mourning as the news of his death spread.

"He was my best friend and a great actor. He was always there by me in my times of trouble. We were a family. He was a good doctor too," said Bengali comedian Chinmoy Roy as he broke down.

He is one of the ever-remembered personalities of the Bengal celluloid.

Filmography
 Amar Mayer Shapath (2003) as Debendranath
 Abar Aranye (2003) as Sanjay Bannerjee
 Desh (2002) as The MLA
 Dahan (1997) as Jhinuk's father
 Moner Manush (1997)
 Lal Darja (1997) as Nabin Datta
 Apan Por (1992) as Doctor
 Jamaibabu
 Asha-o-Bhalobasha (1989)
 Ganashatru (1989) as Biresh
 Ekanta Apan (1987)
 Amar Sangi (1987) as Indranil
 Rajnandini (1980)
 Chorus (1974) as Photo-journalist
 Anindita (1972)
 Chhadmabeshi (1971) as Subimal
 Kuheli (1971) as Prashanto
 Aranyer Din Ratri (1970) (as Subhendu Chatterji) as Sanjay Bannerjee
 Arogya Niketan (film) (1967) as (Subhendu Chatterji) 
 Chowringhee (1968) as Shankar
 Hangsa-Mithun (1968)
 Chiriyakhana (1967) as Bijoy
 Akash Kusum (1965) as Ajay's friend
 Kaach Kata Hirey as friend of Subroto and brother of Uma
 Bhalobasa as Doctor

Awards
 Anandalok Award - Best Actor for Lal Darja in 1998

References

External links

Bengali male television actors
Male actors in Bengali cinema
Male actors from Kolkata
1936 births
2007 deaths
University of Calcutta alumni
Indian male stage actors
20th-century Indian male actors
21st-century Indian male actors